Gauri Gill (born 1970) is an Indian contemporary photographer who lives in New Delhi. She has been called "one of India's most respected photographers" by the New York Times and one of "the most thoughtful photographers active in India today" in The Wire. In 2011 Gill was awarded the Grange Prize, Canada's most prestigious contemporary photography award. The jury said her works "often address ordinary heroism within challenging environments depicting the artist's often-intimate relationships with her subjects with a documentary spirit and a human concern over issues of survival."

Education and early life
Born in Chandigarh, India, Gauri Gill received her BFA in Applied Art at the Delhi College of Arts in New Delhi, India. She earned her BFA in Photography at the Parsons School of Design, New York in 1994, and MFA in Photography at Stanford University in 2002.

Work and career

In The Americans (2000–2007) she photographed her family and friends across the Indian diaspora in America.

A decade-long study of marginalized communities in rural Rajasthan called Notes from the Desert (1999 –ongoing) has resulted in individual exhibitions and projects such as The Mark on the Wall, Jannat, Balika Mela, Birth Series and Ruined Rainbow. Of this work, she says, "The girls who come to the fair have an urge to know. Those who stepped into my photo tend also wished to portray themselves, as they are, or as they see themselves, or to invent new selves for the camera. Their attempts may have been tentative or bold, but this book may be seen as a catalogue of that desire."

The 1984 notebook (2005–2014) is an example of collaboration and 'active listening', and of using photography as a memory practice.

In January 2007, along with Sunil Gupta and Radhika Singh, she co-founded and edited Camerawork Delhi a free newsletter about independent photography from New Delhi and elsewhere.

In 2011 she won the Grange Prize, Canada's most prestigious contemporary photography award.

In 2012, she curated a major exhibition called Transportraits: Women and Mobility in the City investigating safety and experiences of women on the streets.

Since 2013, she has collaborated with Rajesh Vangad, a renowned Warli artist, on Fields of Sight, combining the contemporary language of photography with the ancient one of Warli drawing to co-create new narratives. .

References

External links
Galerie Mirchandani + Steinruecke
Gauri Gill in the collection of The Museum of Modern Art
Projects 108: Gauri Gill at The Museum of Modern Art
Gauri Gill: Acts of Appearance
Staging Images: Gauri Gill Interviewed by Will Fenstermaker at BOMB, 1 November 2021

Indian women photographers
21st-century Indian photographers
1970 births
People from New Delhi
Stanford University alumni
Living people
Photographers from Delhi
20th-century Indian photographers
Indian photojournalists
Indian portrait photographers
20th-century women photographers
21st-century women photographers
20th-century Indian women
Women photojournalists